Palangeh (also Romanized as Palangah and Palangakh) is a village in Khandan Rural District, Tarom Sofla District, Qazvin County, Qazvin Province, Iran. At the 2006 census, its population was 137, in 27 families.

References 

Populated places in Qazvin County